Joseph Rogers may refer to:

Joseph Rogers (pioneer) (1764–1833), founded the town of Rogersville, Tennessee in 1789 
Joseph O. Rogers Jr. (1921–1999), member of the South Carolina House of Representatives
Joseph Rogers (American football) (1924–2011), head coach of the Villanova Wildcats in 1959
Joseph Rogers (Canadian football) (born 1971), CFL wide receiver
Joseph Rogers (English cricketer) (1908–1968), English cricketer for Gloucestershire
Joseph Rogers (physician) (1821–1889), English campaigning medical officer
Joseph Rogers (West Indian cricketer) (died 1946)
Joseph Rogers (footballer) (1868–?), Welsh international footballer
Joseph Rogers (neuroscientist), American neuroscientist
Joseph Rogers (comics), the father of Captain America

See also
Joseph Rodgers (disambiguation)
Joe Rogers (disambiguation)
Joseph Rogers House (disambiguation)